Tom McGuire (1 September 1873 – 6 May 1954) was an English stage and film actor. He appeared in more than 170 films between 1919 and 1949. He was born in Lancashire, England and died in Hollywood, California.

Selected filmography

 The Woman Under Oath (1919)
 The Road of Ambition (1920)
 The Romance Promoters (1920)
 The Girl in the Taxi (1921)
 Cinderella of the Hills (1921)
 See My Lawyer (1921)
 A Front Page Story (1922)
 The Ladder Jinx (1922)
 Single Handed (1923)
 The Self-Made Wife (1923)
 Why Women Remarry (1923)
 The Victor (1923)
 Her Man (1924)
 The Reckless Age (1924)
 Dark Stairways (1924)
 Red Hot Tires (1925)
 Fighting Fate (1925)
 Flaming Waters (1925)
 The Little Giant (1926)
 You'd Be Surprised (1926)
 Pleasure Before Business (1927)
 The Missing Link (1927)
 Steamboat Bill, Jr. (1928)
 Voice of the City (1929)
 City Girl (1930)
 Politics (1931)
 Breach of Promise (1932)
 Among the Missing (1934)
 Transatlantic Merry-Go-Round (1934)

References

External links
 
 

1873 births
1954 deaths
English male film actors
English male silent film actors
English emigrants to the United States
19th-century English male actors
English male stage actors
20th-century English male actors